{{Infobox person
|name    =  Tammy Ader
|image   =
|image_size =
|caption    =
|othername  = Tammy Ader-Green
|birth_name = Tamara J. Ader
|birth_date  = 
|birth_place = New York City, New York, U.S.
|occupation  = Television screenwriter, director & producer
|years_active = 1988–present
|education    = B.A. Brandeis University (1984)
|spouse       =
|children     =
|known_for    = 'Strong Medicine|awards       = * Winner, Gracie Allen Aeard for Outstanding Producing/Best Dramatic Series,  for Strong Medicine (2003)  * Winner, SHINE Award for Best Drama (for Strong Medicine, 2003)
|website      = 
}}
Tammy Ader-Green is an American television writer, director, and producer. She is best known as the creator and executive producer, with Whoopi Goldberg, of the television show Strong Medicine on the Lifetime network. Her other production credits include Dawson's Creek and The Wonder Years. Green received a Gracie Allen Award from the Foundation of American Women in Radio and Television (now the Alliance for Women in Media) for Outstanding Producing and Best Dramatic Series (for Strong Medicine) and the SHINE Award for Best Drama (for Strong Medicine) in 2003.

Green began her writing career as a student at Rush Medical College after attending Brandeis University as an undergraduate. After leaving medical school to pursue writing full-time, she spent most of her career living and working in the Los Angeles, California area. Green is married to Dr. Gary Green, an emergency medicine physician, and lives in Baltimore, Maryland with their son Emmet. Gary Green has been vice chair of emergency medicine at New York University School of Medicine and an associate professor of emergency medicine and pathology at the Johns Hopkins University.

Production creditsStrong MedicineDawson's CreekSistersW.I.O.U.The Wonder YearsQuantum Leapthirtysomething (hired by Edward Zwick and Marshall Herskovitz)Party of FiveThe Young and the RestlessOutlaw Force''

External links

American soap opera writers
Television producers from New York City
American women television producers
Brandeis University alumni
American women television writers
Living people
Writers from New York City
Women soap opera writers
Screenwriters from New York (state)
Rush Medical College alumni
Year of birth missing (living people)